Milligan may refer to:

People
 Milligan (surname), a surname (including a list of people with the name)

Places
 Milligan, Florida, an unincorporated community in Okaloosa County, Florida
 Milligan, Indiana, an unincorporated community
 Milligan, Nebraska, a village
 Milligan, Ohio, an unincorporated community
 Milligan, Texas, an unincorporated community in Collin County, Texas

Other uses
 Milligan College, a college near Greeneville, Tennessee
 Ex Parte Milligan, a United States Supreme Court case
 Miss Milligan, a solitaire card game